Aldus Roger (February 10, 1915 – April 4, 1999) was an American Cajun accordion player in southwest Louisiana, best known for his accordion skills, and television music program.

Early life
Aldus Roger was born in Carencro, Louisiana and learned to play the Cajun accordion at age eight.  His father, Francis Roger, didn't want him to play accordion; however, he would borrow it and play in the barn.

Lafayette Playboys
Roger led the Lafayette Playboys for over twenty years. During the late 1950s and 1960s, he hosted his own music program Passe Partout on KLFY-TV 10 in Lafayette. Among his many recordings are "KLFY Waltz," "Channel 10 Two Step," "Mardi Gras Dance," and "Lafayette Two Step (1964)." He also recorded a Cajun French version of Hank Williams country-and- western hit "Jambalaya (On the Bayou)" (which Williams in turn had based on the Cajun tune "Grand Texas").

He recorded several albums, one with Rounder Records entitled "Aldus Roger & the Lafayette Playboys - Legend Series" in 1998 and another with La Louisiane Records entitled "Plays the French Music of South Louisiana" in 1993.

The Aldus Roger song "Les Haricots Sont Pas Salés" (translated: "The Snap Beans Ain't Salty") is covered by Ambrose Thibodeaux in some of The Sims.

See also
 List of Notable People Related to Cajun Music
 History of Cajun Music

References

Bibliography

1915 births
1999 deaths
Cajun accordionists
Feature Records artists
People from Carencro, Louisiana
20th-century American musicians
20th-century accordionists